Copdock is a village and former civil parish, now in the parish of Copdock and Washbrook, in the Babergh district, in the county of Suffolk, England. In 1961 the civil parish had a population of 399.

Location
It is located on the former A12 road (now designated as the C475), which was blocked off at Whights Corner after the construction of the Copdock Interchange and the A14 road Ipswich bypass.

Governance
On 1 April 1994 the parish was merged with Washbrook to form "Copdock and Washbrook".

Description 

It has a local primary school called Copdock Primary School, and the local church is called St. Peter's Copdock and is a Church of England.
The local village hall, located on the old A12, was built in 1991, and is situated within the grounds of the local playing fields.  Various sports clubs use the playing fields; and they are home to a thriving cricket team, Copdock & Old Ipswichian CC.  The Best Western Ipswich Hotel is located opposite the village hall.

Notable persons
William Henry Hewitt, recipient of the Victoria Cross, was born in Copdock in 1884.

References

External links

Copdock at Streetmap.co.uk
Official Copdock & Washbrook website 
Copdock Primary School

Villages in Suffolk
Former civil parishes in Suffolk
Babergh District